The National Zoological Garden of South Africa (also informally known as The Pretoria Zoo) is an  zoo located in Pretoria, South Africa. It is the national zoo of South Africa, and was founded by J. W. B. Gunning in 1899. Pretoria Zoo is one of the eight largest zoos in the world and one of the most highly rated.

History
The farm Klein Schoemansdal, the property of Z.A.R. president Stephanus Schoeman, was sold to Johannes Francois Celliers who renamed it Rus in Urbe. It was acquired by the state in 1895, and the zoological garden was established at the outbreak of the Second Boer War in 1899. It became the official National Zoological Gardens in 1916. After a period of management under the auspices of the South African National Research Foundation, the Pretoria Zoo today is management under the umbrella of the South African National Biodiversity Institute (SANBI).

Landscape
Half of the zoo is situated on relatively flat ground, while the other half is located on the slopes of a hill. The two areas are separated by the Apies River flowing through the zoo. Two bridges provide access over the river.

Infrastructure
Around  of pathways are laid out in the zoo. Golf carts are available for rent for those that prefer not to walk; most, but not all of the exhibits are accessible by golf cart. A cable car links the top of the hill with a point close to the entrance at the bottom. Two restaurants are located within the zoo, besides a picnic area on the banks of the Apies River. A crafts market is located outside the zoo entrance.

Exhibits

Proceeding from the entrance a visitor encounters a walk-through aviary, enclosures for African penguins, Cape fur seals, leopards, flamingoes, and lemurs, further bird aviaries and the hamadryas baboon and monkey enclosures along the western boundary.

At the centre of the zoo large sections are set aside for the African savannah waterhole and a set of large enclosures for smaller carnivores, cheetahs, black and white rhinos, giraffes, African bush elephants, hippos, plains zebras,  African buffaloes and okapis respectively. Amongst these are smaller enclosures for  primates, African wild dogs, red kangaroos and breeding units for birds.

Against the northern hillside are large enclosures for lions, tigers, brown bears, Nubian ibexes, western lowland gorillas and other animals. In the western section the zoo includes two aquariums, and a reptile park, accessed via a separate entrance.

Gallery

References

External links 

 
 360 degree Virtual Tour of the Pretoria Zoo

Buildings and structures in Pretoria
Zoos in South Africa
Aviaries in South Africa
Aquaria in South Africa
Tourist attractions in Pretoria
Zoos established in 1899
History of Pretoria